Transgender Persons (Protection of Rights) Bill, 2017 is a bill passed by Senate of Pakistan to recognize transgender rights and allow transgender individuals to register as their true gender.

References

Senate of Pakistan
2018 in Pakistan
LGBT law in Pakistan
Transgender law
Acts of the Parliament of Pakistan
2018 in LGBT history